John G. Williams may refer to:
 John Williams (rugby union, born 1946), South African rugby player
 John G. Williams (Canadian politician) (born 1946), Canadian politician
 John G. Williams (ornithologist) (1913–1997), Welsh ornithologist
 John G. Williams Jr. (1924–1991), American admiral
 John Gary Williams, American musician
 John Green Williams (1796–1833), American politician
 John Griffith Williams (born 1944), Welsh judge

See also 
 John Williams (disambiguation)